Krupička is a Czech family name.

People
Czech
:cs:Rudolf Krupička (1879-1951), Czech dramatist, kwho also wrote the lyrics of "Oblačný pták" (Cloud Bird) for mixed chorus among the list of compositions by Josef Bohuslav Foerster
:cs:Jiří Krupička (1913-2014) Czech geologist
Zdeněk Krupička, Czech ice sledge hockey player who represented Czech Republic at the 2014 Winter Paralympics, also at the 2005, 2007, 2008, 2009 and 2011 IPC Ice Sledge Hockey European Championships
Miroslav Krupička, director of Radio Prague

Americans
Rob Krupicka (1971), American Democratic politician
Anton Krupicka, American ultra-runner
Jarda Krupicka (1946), Czech defector to America, former professional ice hockey player

References

Czech-language surnames